Murroes is a  parish in Angus, Scotland, situated approximately  north of Dundee city centre.

Places of interest
 The parish church was built in 1848
 Ballumbie House
 Powrie Castle
 Wedderburn Castle

Notable residents
 In the reign of Charles II the minister was Robert Edward, author of an account of Forfarshire.
 His son was the non-juror Alexander Edward, who later became a notable architect and landscape architect.
 James Durham

References

Villages in Angus, Scotland
Parishes in Angus